The following lists events that happened during 1948 in the Hashemite Kingdom of Jordan.

Incumbents
Monarch: Abdullah I 
Prime Minister: Tawfik Abu al-Huda

Events

May
 May 15 - The British Mandate of Palestine is officially terminated, causing expeditionary forces from Egypt, Transjordan, Syria and Iraq to invade Israel and clash with Israeli forces.

See also

 Years in Iraq
 Years in Syria
 Years in Saudi Arabia

References

 
1940s in Jordan
Jordan
Jordan
Years of the 20th century in Jordan